Kablovska televizija KG-1 or KG 1 is a Bosnian local commercial Cable television channel based in Goražde, Bosnia and Herzegovina. The program is mainly produced in Bosnian language.

References

Television stations in Bosnia and Herzegovina
Companies of Bosnia and Herzegovina